Grevillea paniculata, commonly known as kerosene bush, is a species of flowering plant in the family Proteaceae and is endemic to the south-west of Western Australia. It is a dense shrub with divided leaves, the lobes linear, and more or less spherical clusters of white to cream-coloured flowers.

Description
The edges of the leaves are rolled under, obscuring the lower surface except for the prominent mid-veins.

Taxonomy
Grevillea paniculata was first formally described in 1845 by Carl Meissner in Johann Georg Christian Lehmann's Plantae Preissianae based on plant material collected by Ludwig Preiss near  York in 1840. The specific epithet (paniculata) means "paniculate".

Distribution and habitat
This grevillea grows in shrubland or heath on sandplains, near granite outcrops and on hills between Mundaring, Hyden, Merredin Pithara and Bonnie Rock in the Avon Wheatbelt, Coolgardie, Geraldton Sandplains, Jarrah Forest, Mallee and Yalgoo bioregions of south-western Western Australia.

Conservation status
Grevillea paniculata is listed as  "not threatened" by the Government of Western Australia Department of Biodiversity, Conservation and Attractions.

References

paniculata
Endemic flora of Western Australia
Eudicots of Western Australia
Proteales of Australia
Taxa named by Carl Meissner
Plants described in 1845